Donald E. Adams (February 23, 1921 – August 30, 1952) was a United States Air Force flying ace during the Korean War.

He was born in Caton, New York. After earning a bachelor's degree from Western Michigan College in 1942, he enlisted in the United States Army Air Forces. He was awarded his pilot's wings and commissioned a second lieutenant on August 30, 1943. He then served as an instructor at Newport, Arkansas until July 1944. In February 1945, however, he joined the 343rd Fighter Squadron of the 55th Fighter Group in the European Theater of World War II, and was credited with two enemy aircraft destroyed on the ground.

He remained in the military after the war, flying F-80 Shooting Star and F-86 Sabre jet fighters as part of the 62d Fighter Squadron of the 56th Fighter Group at Selfridge AFB, Michigan, from July 1947 to October 1951.

As part of the 16th Fighter Interceptor Squadron of the 51st Fighter Interceptor Group in the Korean War, Major Adams was credited with 6.5 enemy aircraft shot down between January and May 1952, making him an ace. He was awarded a Silver Star for leading a squadron of six against 20 "MIG type aircraft" on May 3 and downing two of the enemy.

Transferred back to the United States, Adams was killed in a Detroit airshow crash on August 30, 1952, making him one of only two Korean War flying aces to die before the end of the war, the other being George A. Davis, Jr. Major Adams and his radar operator died after a wing tore off their Northrop F-89 Scorpion.

See also
List of Korean War flying aces

References

Sources

1921 births
1952 deaths
American Korean War flying aces
Aviators from New York (state)
Aviators killed in aviation accidents or incidents in the United States
Recipients of the Silver Star
United States Army Air Forces pilots of World War II
United States Air Force officers
Victims of aviation accidents or incidents in 1952
Recipients of the Distinguished Flying Cross (United States)
Recipients of the Air Medal
Military personnel from New York (state)